Bess or BESS may refer to:
 Bess (name), a given name and surname
 Bess (content-control software), a brand of web filtering software
 Bess (Dane), legendary Danish general mentioned in Gesta Danorum
 Bess (singer), Finnish singer
 BESS (experiment), a particle physics experiment
 Basic Enlisted Submarine School, the United States Navy's school for enlisted submariners
 Lake Bess, Florida, United States
 Mount Bess, on the border between Alberta and British Columbia, Canada
 Bess beetle, a family of beetles
 Bess Press, an American publisher
 Delta Bessborough or The Bess, a hotel in Saskatoon, Saskatchewan, Canada
 Battery energy storage system

See also
 BES (disambiguation)
 Besse (disambiguation)
 Brown Bess, nickname of a British Army musket
 Old Bess (beam engine)
 Tropical Storm Bess, a list of storms